Dominik Merseburg (born 15 September 1991) is a German professional racing cyclist. He rode in the men's team time trial at the 2016 UCI Road World Championships.

References

External links
 

1991 births
Living people
German male cyclists
Place of birth missing (living people)